Silvia Semeraro (born 2 May 1996) is an Italian karateka. She won the gold medal in the women's kumite 68 kg event at the 2022 World Games held in Birmingham, United States. She also won the gold medal in the same event at the 2019 European Games held in Minsk, Belarus. She won the silver medal in the women's 68 kg event at the 2021 World Karate Championships held in Dubai, United Arab Emirates.

She represented Italy at the 2020 Summer Olympics in Tokyo, Japan. She competed in the women's +61 kg event.

Career 

At the 2018 European Karate Championships held in Novi Sad, Serbia, she won the silver medal in the team kumite event and one of the bronze medals in the women's kumite 68 kg event. A month later, she won the gold medal in the women's kumite 68 kg event at the 2018 Mediterranean Games held in Tarragona, Spain.

In 2021, she qualified at the World Olympic Qualification Tournament held in Paris, France to compete at the 2020 Summer Olympics in Tokyo, Japan. At the Olympics, she finished in third place in her pool during the pool stage in the women's +61 kg event and she did not advance to compete in the semifinals. In October 2021, she won the gold medal in her event at the 2021 Mediterranean Karate Championships held in Limassol, Cyprus. In November 2021, she won the silver medal in the women's 68 kg event at the World Karate Championships held in Dubai, United Arab Emirates. She also won one of the bronze medals in the women's team kumite event.

She competed in the women's 68 kg event at the 2022 European Karate Championships held in Gaziantep, Turkey. She won the silver medal in the women's 68 kg event at the 2022 Mediterranean Games held in Oran, Algeria. In the final, she lost against Feryal Abdelaziz of Egypt. She won the gold medal in the women's 68 kg event at the 2022 World Games held in Birmingham, United States.

Achievements

References

External links 

 

Living people
1996 births
Sportspeople from Taranto
Italian female karateka
Karateka at the 2019 European Games
European Games medalists in karate
European Games gold medalists for Italy
Competitors at the 2018 Mediterranean Games
Competitors at the 2022 Mediterranean Games
Mediterranean Games gold medalists for Italy
Mediterranean Games silver medalists for Italy
Mediterranean Games medalists in karate
Karateka at the 2020 Summer Olympics
Olympic karateka of Italy
Competitors at the 2022 World Games
World Games gold medalists
World Games medalists in karate
21st-century Italian women